Baghaberd (also David Bek's Castle) is a 4th to 12th century Armenian fortress located along a ridge overlooking the Voghji River,  northwest of the village of Kapan in the Syunik Province of Armenia.

History
Baghaberd is thought to have been built in the 4th century by Baghak of Sisak Nahapet.  According to Stepanos Orbelian's History of the Province of Syunik (Patmutyun Nahangin Sisakan), in the mid-4th century Prince Andovk, the hereditary lord of Syunik, attacked and plundered one of the cities of the Persian Sassanid King Shapur II (309-379) while the king was at war with the Huns.  King Shapur II was furious about the incident and took his armies to Syunik to defeat the prince.  Andovk and his troops went to Baghaberd with a large supply of provisions and waited.  Once the king's forces arrived at the fortress, Andovk and his men defeated three of Shapur's military units by rolling rocks down the cliffside upon them.

Prince Andovk soon fled to Constantinople and his subjects scattered.  When he arrived, he was given honors by the Emperor Theodosius I showered him with great honors.

Baghaberd became the last capital of the Syunik kingdom after the destruction of the nearby village of Kapan in the year 1103.  In 1170, the fortress was captured by the Seljuq Turks.

References

External links 

 Armeniapedia.org: Baghaberd Fortress
 Kapan.am: Baghaberd and other fortresses  
 About Baghaberd

Archaeological sites in Armenia
Castles in Armenia
Forts in Armenia
Tourist attractions in Syunik Province
Buildings and structures in Syunik Province
Buildings and structures completed in the 4th century